Debra DeLee (born 1948) was Chair of the Democratic National Committee from 1994 to 1995, and was the second woman to hold the post.  She also served as CEO of the Democratic National Committee.

She is currently President and CEO of Americans for Peace Now (APN), a national Zionist organization dedicated to enhancing Israel's security through peace and to supporting the Israeli Peace Now movement.  She was born in Chicago, Illinois, is a graduate of the University of Wisconsin, Madison.  She was a superdelegate for the 2008 Democratic National Convention and endorsed United States Senator Hillary Clinton of New York in the primaries.

References

External links

|-

1948 births
20th-century American politicians
20th-century American women politicians
Democratic National Committee chairs
Jewish American politicians
Living people
21st-century American Jews
21st-century American women